The Waterberg dwarf gecko (Lygodactylus waterbergensis) is a species of gecko endemic to Limpopo in South Africa.

References

Lygodactylus
Reptiles described in 1992